Vingtaine de Hérupe is one of the three vingtaines of the Parish of St John in Jersey, Channel Islands. It contains the village of Sion, Centre Stone and the Macpéla cemetery.

The Vingtaine de Hérupe, Vingtaine du Nord and Vingtaine du Douet all form a single electoral district of St John.

Herupe
Saint John, Jersey